Ibbara Naduve Muddina Aata is a 1996 Indian Kannada-language comedy-drama film directed by Relangi Narasimha Rao and produced by T. M. Venkataswamy. The film stars Shiva Rajkumar, Raghavendra Rajkumar, Kasthuri and Swarna. The film's score and soundtrack was composed by Sadhu Kokila. Cinematography was by Nagendra Kumar Mothukuri, director Relangi Narsimha Rao's long time collaborator.

This was director Relangi's second movie with Raghavendra Rajkumar after their hit comedy movie Geluvina Sardara. Relangi also went on to work with Shiva Rajkumar in another movie later - Raja. This was also the only movie in which Raghavendra Rajkumar and Shiva Rajkumar were seen together on-screen though both of them were part of the 1974 movie Sri Srinivasa Kalyana as child actors but did not have any scenes together.

Cast 

 Shiva Rajkumar 
 Raghavendra Rajkumar
 Kasthuri
 Swarna
 Tara
 Srinivasa Murthy
 Mukhyamantri Chandru
 Bank Janardhan
 Umashri
 B. V. Radha
 Girija Lokesh
 Kunigal Nagabhushan

Soundtrack 
The soundtrack of the film was composed by Sadhu Kokila.

References 

1996 films
1990s Kannada-language films
1996 romantic comedy-drama films
Indian romantic comedy-drama films
1996 comedy films
1996 drama films
Films directed by Relangi Narasimha Rao